The Focke-Wulf Ta 154 Moskito was a fast twin-engined German night fighter aircraft designed by Kurt Tank and produced by Focke-Wulf during late World War II. Only a few were produced, proving to have less impressive performance than the prototypes.

Development
Kurt Tank's team at Focke-Wulf had been working for some time on a fast attack-bomber aircraft named Ta 211, so named because it planned to use an uprated Jumo 211R engine. The intended "Ta 211" design was a high-wing twin-engined design, built primarily of plywood, bonded with a special phenolic resin adhesive called Tego film. The only large-scale use of metal was in the pressurized cockpit.

The project's designation was changed to Reichsluftfahrtministerium (RLM—Ministry of Aviation) airframe number 8-154 (hence Ta 154) when it became apparent that the most suitable engine for the aircraft was the more powerful Jumo 213, and that Junkers could not deliver the Jumo 211R in time due to technical and production problems. The 154 was also allocated the name "Moskito" as a form of recognition of the Royal Air Forces (RAF) de Havilland Mosquito.

It was at about this time that the light and very fast de Havilland Mosquito, also made of wood, arrived over Germany. It quickly racked up an impressive record; in its first 600 bombing missions, only one was shot down, compared to an average of 5% for RAF medium and heavy bombers. Erhard Milch personally requested a purpose-built German answer, and selected the 154. Infighting within German circles started almost immediately, because the RLM and night fighter units — as well as Ernst Heinkel himself — still wanted the Heinkel He 219. Milch took this personally, and spent the better part of the next two years trying to have the 219 program terminated, partly against Ernst Heinkel's wishes.

Flight tests

Development of the Ta 154 was already well advanced, and the first prototype V1 with Jumo 211F engines, bearing the Stammkennzeichen identification code TE+FE,  made its maiden flight on July 1, 1943. It was followed by V2 with Jumo 211N engines, which was kept at the factory for handling trials. V1 was then sent to Rechlin-Lärz Airfield for fly-off testing against the He 219A and the new Junkers Ju 388. There the 154 reached almost 700 km/h (440 mph) and easily outflew the other two aircraft, but those were both fully armed and equipped with radar.

The first armed example of the Ta 154 was the V3 prototype, which was also the first to fit the Jumo 211R engines. The added weight of the guns and drag of the 32-dipole element Matratze radar antennas used on its UHF-band FuG 212 C-1 Lichtenstein radar unit slowed the aircraft by a full 75 km/h, although it was still somewhat faster than the He 219. The rest of the 15 prototypes were then delivered as A-0 models, identical to the V3. Some of these also included a raised canopy for better vision to the rear.

By June 1944, the Jumo 213 was finally arriving in some numbers, and a production run of 154 A-1s was completed with these engines. Just prior to delivery the only factory making Tego-Film, in Wuppertal, was bombed out by the Royal Air Force, and the plywood glue had to be replaced by one that was not as strong, and was later found to react chemically, apparently in a corrosive manner, with the wood in the Ta 154's structure. In July, several A-1s crashed with wing failure due to plywood delamination. This same problem also critically affected the Heinkel He 162 Spatz, Ernst Heinkel's "Volksjäger" jet fighter program entry.

Tank halted production in August, and the RLM eventually cancelled the entire project in September (Milch had been removed by then). At that time about 50 production aircraft had been completed, and a number of the A-0 preproduction aircraft were later modified to production standard. An unknown number of the aircraft served with Nachtjagdgeschwader 3, and a few were later used as training aircraft for jet pilots.

Mistel/Pulkzerstörer variants
The designation Ta 154A-2/U3 was given to six unfinished 154A-1 airframes completed and converted into Pulkzerstörer (Formation Destroyer) aircraft.  At least three Pulkzerstörer and Mistel parasite fighter schemes were mooted for the 154.  The only one of the three that was actually brought to operational readiness (Ta 154A-2/U3) was a system whereby the entire forward fuselage ahead of the fuel tanks was filled with Amatol high explosive.  A new and extremely small cockpit for the pilot was added to the airframe directly ahead of the tailfin.  From this cramped cabin, the pilot would fly the 'Bomb Moskito ' into an Allied bomber formation, arm the onboard charges and quickly bail out.  A timer would then detonate the explosives a few seconds later. Fragmentation charges in the warhead would maximize the effective area of destruction.  It was hoped that this flying bomb system would tear large holes in the Anglo-American bomber streams at little cost to the Luftwaffe in terms of pilot casualties. The six Ta 154A-2/U3 'Bomb Moskitos''' were completed at the Focke-Wulf plant near Poznań shortly before the occupation of the area by the Red Army, but were not used in combat. Their ultimate fate is unknown, though it is likely they were destroyed by the plant's staff to prevent them being captured.  One Ta 154 Mistel scheme, reportedly designated Mistel 7, envisaged a Focke-Wulf Fw 190 'mother aircraft' mounted on struts above an unmanned Bomb Moskito.  Takeoff would be effected via a sturdy three-wheeled trolley of the same type designed for the abandoned A-series of the Arado Ar 234 jet reconnaissance bomber.  The trolley would be jettisoned after takeoff, leaving the Mistel Moskito to fly to its target with all three engines running.  The combination would formate above an Allied bomber stream before the 190 pilot released the Bomb Moskito, which would then hopefully crash straight into a bomber with massively destructive effect.  A related scheme would see a standard Ta 154 towing a Bomb Moskito'' behind it into the middle of a bomber stream, whereupon release and detonation would be initiated by the manned 154's pilot.

Specifications (Ta 154 A-1)

See also

References

External links

Picture and specifications of Ta 154
Focke-Wulf Ta.154

Abandoned military aircraft projects of Germany
Ta 154
1940s German fighter aircraft
World War II night fighter aircraft of Germany
High-wing aircraft
Aircraft first flown in 1943
Twin piston-engined tractor aircraft